Sarpedon is the name of several figures in Greek mythology
 Sarpedon, a son of Zeus, who fought on the side of Troy in the Trojan War. Although in the Iliad, he was the son of Zeus and Laodamia, the daughter of Bellerophon, in the later standard tradition, he was the son of Zeus and Europa, and the brother of Minos and Rhadamanthus, while in other accounts the Sarpedon who fought at Troy was the grandson of the Sarpedon who was the brother of Minos.
 Sarpedon, a Thracian son of Poseidon, eponym of Cape Sarpedon near the outlet of the River Hebrus, and brother to Poltys, King of Aenus. Unlike the other two Sarpedons, this Thracian Sarpedon was not a hero, but an insolent individual who was shot to death by Heracles as the latter was sailing away from Aenus.
 Sarpedon, son of Zeus and Lardane and brother of Argus.

Notes

References 
 Apollodorus, The Library with an English Translation by Sir James George Frazer, F.B.A., F.R.S. in 2 Volumes, Cambridge, MA, Harvard University Press; London, William Heinemann Ltd. 1921. ISBN 0-674-99135-4. Online version at the Perseus Digital Library. Greek text available from the same website.
Hard, Robin, The Routledge Handbook of Greek Mythology: Based on H.J. Rose's "Handbook of Greek Mythology", Psychology Press, 2004, . Google Books.
 Homer, The Iliad with an English Translation by A.T. Murray, Ph.D. in two volumes. Cambridge, MA., Harvard University Press; London, William Heinemann, Ltd. 1924. . Online version at the Perseus Digital Library.
Homer, Homeri Opera in five volumes. Oxford, Oxford University Press. 1920. . Greek text available at the Perseus Digital Library.
 Pausanias, Description of Greece with an English Translation by W.H.S. Jones, Litt.D., and H.A. Ormerod, M.A., in 4 Volumes. Cambridge, MA, Harvard University Press; London, William Heinemann Ltd. 1918. . Online version at the Perseus Digital Library
Pausanias, Graeciae Descriptio. 3 vols. Leipzig, Teubner. 1903.  Greek text available at the Perseus Digital Library.

Demigods in classical mythology
Children of Poseidon
Thracian characters in Greek mythology
Mythology of Heracles